ECFA may refer to:
Eosinophil chemotactic factor of anaphylaxis, released from mast cell granules.
Economic Cooperation Framework Agreement, agreement between Mainland China and Taiwan
Evangelical Council for Financial Accountability, accrediting association for evangelical Christian organizations